Anthomyza is a genus of flies in the family Anthomyzidae. It is found in the  Palearctic.

References

External links

Anthomyzidae
Opomyzoidea genera